Dörflingen is a village and a municipality in the canton of Schaffhausen in Switzerland. It borders a short strip of the north shore of the Rhine.

History
Dörflingen is first mentioned in 1264 as Dorfelingen.

Geography

Of this area, 64.3% is used for agricultural purposes, while 26.9% is forested. Of the rest of the land, 7.5% is settled (buildings or roads) and the remainder (1.4%) is non-productive (rivers or lakes).

Economy
Dörflingen has an unemployment rate of 1.02%. , there were 60 people employed in the primary economic sector and about 26 businesses involved in this sector. 68 people are employed in the secondary sector and there are 9 businesses in this sector. 56 people are employed in the tertiary sector, with 14 businesses in this sector.

 the mid year average unemployment rate was 1.3%. There were 22 non-agrarian businesses in the municipality and 64.2% of the (non-agrarian) population was involved in the secondary sector of the economy while 35.8% were involved in the third. At the same time, 72.4% of the working population was employed full-time, and 27.6% was employed part-time. There were 123 residents of the municipality who were employed in some capacity, of which females made up 26% of the workforce.  there were 81 residents who worked in the municipality, while 319 residents worked outside Dörflingen and 41 people commuted into the municipality for work.

, there is 1 restaurant and the hospitality industry in Dörflingen employs 7 people.

Demographics
In 2008 a total of 11.6% of the population were foreign nationals. Of the foreign population,, 53.2% are from Germany, 13.8% are from Italy, 1.1% are from Croatia, 1.1% are from Serbia, and 30.9% are from another country. Over the last 10 years the population has grown at a rate of 3.9%. Most of the population speaks German (96.6%), with Italian being second most common (1.4%) and Serbo-Croatian being third (0.8%).

The age distribution of the population is children and teenagers (0–19 years old) make up 22.7% of the population, while adults (20–64 years old) make up 62.9% and seniors (over 64 years old) make up 14.4%.

In the 2007 federal election the most popular party was the SVP which received 42.9% of the vote. The next two most popular parties were the SP (28.7%), and the FDP (28.3%) .

The entire Swiss population is generally well educated. In Dörflingen about 86.2% of the population (between age 25–64) have completed either non-mandatory upper secondary education or additional higher education (either university or a Fachhochschule). In Dörflingen, 1.4% of the population attend kindergarten or another pre-school, 7.11% attend a Primary School, 4.82% attend a lower level Secondary School, and 3.17% attend a higher level Secondary School.

, 18.9% of the population belonged to the Roman Catholic Church and 61.7% belonged to the Swiss Reformed Church.

The historical population is given in the following table:

Sights
The village of Dörflingen is designated as part of the Inventory of Swiss Heritage Sites.

Images

References

External links

 

Municipalities of the canton of Schaffhausen